Rosegarland is a rural residential locality in the local government area of Derwent Valley in the South-east region of Tasmania. The 2016 census determined a population of 75 for the state suburb of Rosegarland.

History
Rosegarland was gazetted as a locality in 1959. Rose Garland was the name of property in the district in 1854, and the 'Rosegarland Inn' existed in 1877.

Geography
The Derwent River forms the southern boundary.

Road infrastructure
The Lyell Highway (A10) enters from the south-east and runs through to the north-west, where it exits. Route B61 (Gordon River Road) starts at an intersection with A10 on the northern boundary and runs away to the south-west.

References

Localities of Derwent Valley Council
Towns in Tasmania